Ismail Serageldin (born 1944 in Giza, Egypt), Founding Director of the Bibliotheca Alexandrina (BA), the new Library of Alexandria, inaugurated in 2002, is currently, Emeritus Librarian, and member of the Board of Trustees of the Library of Alexandria. He serves as Chair or Member of a number of advisory committees for academic, research, scientific and international institutions and civil society efforts, and serves on the Advisory Committee of the World Social Science Report for 2013 and 2016, as well as the UNESCO-supported World Water Scenarios (2013) and the executive council of the Encyclopedia of Life (2010) and Chairs the Executive Council of the World Digital Library (2010). He also co-chaired the African Union's high level panel for Biotechnology (2006) and again for Science, Technology and Innovation (STI) in 2012–2013, and was a member of the ICANN Panel for the review of the internet future (2013).

Before that he notably co-chaired the Inter-Academy Panel on Capacity Building for Science in (2003-2004) and was a member of the High Level group for the Alliance of Civilizations convened by the Secretary General of the United Nations (2006-2007). He has held many important international positions, including Vice President of the World Bank (1992-2000), and Chairman Consultative Group on International Agricultural Research (CGIAR, 1994–2000), founder and former Chairman of the Global Water Partnership (GWP, 1996–2000) and the Consultative Group to Assist the Poorest (CGAP), a micro finance program (1995-2000) and was professor of the International Savoirs Contre Pauvreté (Knowledge Against Poverty), at Collège de France, Paris, and distinguished professor at Wageningen University in the Netherlands. Serageldin is sometimes referred to as the "most intelligent man in Egypt".

Serageldin has published over 100 books and monographs and over 500 papers on a variety of topics, including biotechnology, rural development, sustainability, and the value of science to society. He has hosted a cultural program on television in Egypt (over 130 episodes) and developed a TV Science Series in Arabic and English. He holds a Bachelor of Science Degree in Engineering from Cairo University and a master's degree and a Ph.D. from Harvard University and has received 38 honorary doctorates.

In August 2017, an Egyptian judge sentenced Serageldin to three and a half years in prison, for alleged management decisions he made prior to 2011. 
Over 300 eminent persons, including 90 Nobel Prize winners and 20 current and former heads of state, signed a letter supporting Serageldin and objecting to the verdict, and the  case was  appealed.

On 26 December 2017, the Appeals Court delivered its verdict and dismissed all the charges against Ismail Serageldin. The Court found that all the accusations were baseless. Ismail Serageldin is now declared innocent of all the allegations made against him during the previous seven years.

Biography 

Ismail Serageldin, Founding Director of the Bibliotheca Alexandrina (BA), the new Library of Alexandria, inaugurated in 2002, is currently, Emeritus Librarian, and member of the Board of Trustees of the Library of Alexandria.  He is advisor to the Egyptian Prime Minister in matters concerning culture, science and museums. He serves as Chair or Member of a number of advisory committees for academic, research, scientific and international institutions and civil society efforts, including as co-chair of the Nizami Ganjavi International Center (NGIC),  and serves on the Advisory Committee of the World Social Science Report for 2013 and 2016, as well as the UNESCO-supported World Water Scenarios (2013) and the executive council of the Encyclopedia of Life (2010) and Chairs the Executive Council of the World Digital Library (2010). He also co-chaired the African Union's high level panel for Biotechnology (2006) and again for Science, Technology and Innovation (STI) in 2012–2013, and was a member of the ICANN Panel for the review of the internet future (2013).

Before that he notably co-chaired the Inter-Academy Panel on Capacity Building for Science in (2003-2004) and was a member of the High Level group for the Alliance of Civilizations convened by the Secretary General of the United Nations (2006-2007). He is a member of many academies, including the US National Academy of Sciences (Public Welfare Medalist), the American Philosophical Society, the American Academy of Arts and Sciences, the World Academy of Sciences (TWAS), the World Academy of Arts and Sciences (WAAS), the European Academy of Sciences and Arts, the African Academy of Sciences, Institut d'Egypte (Egyptian Academy of Science), the Royal Belgian Academy, the Bangladesh Academy of Sciences, the Indian National Academy of Agricultural Sciences. He lectures widely, and has delivered the Mandela Lecture in Johannesburg (2011) and the Nexus Lecture in Tilburg, the Netherlands (2011) as well as the opening keynote address to the first International Summit of the Book at the Library of Congress in Washington DC (2012). He has received the Order of the Rising Sun from Japan and the Légion d'honneur from France and is a Commandeur of Arts and Letters of the French Republic. In 2013, Serageldin and the BA received the Calouste Gulbenkian International Prize for thoughts and actions that make a decisive contribution to, and have significant impact on understanding, defending and fostering the universal values of respect for diversity and difference, a culture of tolerance and the conservation of the environment. He has also received the Pablo Neruda Medal from Chile, India's Bajaj Prize for upholding Gandhian values outside India, and was the first recipient of the Grameen Prize for lifelong efforts to fight poverty, and received the Champion of Youth Award by the World Youth Congress in Canada.

Early years 
Serageldin was graduated with First class honors in 1964 from Cairo University from which he holds a Bachelor of Science Degree in Engineering. In 1968, he earned his master's degree with distinction from Harvard University followed by a PhD from the same university four years later. Prior to joining the World Bank, he worked as a consultant in city and regional planning, and taught at Cairo University and Harvard University.

Career 
Serageldin joined the World Bank through the Young Professionals Program after completing his Ph.D. at Harvard University.

Serageldin worked in a number of capacities in the World bank since joining in 1972 and became vice president for Environmentally Sustainable Development in October 1992 (effective January 1, 1993). Economist in education and human resources (1972–76); Division Chief for Technical Assistance and Special Studies (1977–80), and for Urban Projects in Europe, the Middle East and North Africa (1980–83); Director for Programs in West Africa (1984–87), Country Director for Central and Occidental Africa (1987–89), Technical Director for all Sub-Saharan Africa (1990–92), and vice-president for Environmentally and Socially Sustainable Development (1993–98). In addition, he was active in promoting NGO-Bank relations, and served as co-chairman of the NGO-Bank Committee (1997–99).

He has held many important international positions, including Vice President of the World Bank (1992-2000), and the 7th Chairman Consultative Group on International Agricultural Research (CGIAR, 1994–2000), founder and former Chairman of the Global Water Partnership (GWP, 1996–2000) and the Consultative Group to Assist the Poorest (CGAP), a microfinance program (1995-2000) and was professor of the International Savoirs Contre Pauvreté (Knowledge Against Poverty), at Collège de France, Paris, and distinguished professor at Wageningen University in the Netherlands.

After a career of 28 years at the World Bank, Ismail Serageldin resigned on 10 July 2000 to return to his home country, Egypt.

Currently, Serageldin is Emeritus Librarian, and member of the Board of Trustees of the Library of Alexandria.  
Throughout that long career, Serageldin has been known as an innovator who always pushed the envelope of current thinking with a view to introduce more of the "non-economic" facets of development into the mainstream paradigm: social issues, gender, environment, culture, and governance. An ardent advocate of the poor and the marginalized, he also built bridges between the civil society and the Bank. An overall assessment of Ismail Serageldin's career at the Bank is eloquently summed up in the statement released by World Bank President James D. Wolfensohn on the occasion of Serageldin's retirement.

Currently 
 Emeritus Librarian, Library of Alexandria
 Member of Board of Trustees of the Library of Alexandria
 Member of Board of Trustees of Beirut Arab University (BAU), Beirut
 Advisor to the Egyptian Prime Minister in matters concerning culture, science and museums
 Ambassador of the Alliance of Civilizations
 Chairman of the Executive Council of the World Digital Library (WDL).
 Chair and member of a number of Boards of Directors and advisory committees for academic, research, scientific and international institutions and civil society effort.
 Co-chair of the UNESCO supported World Water Scenarios (2013) and the executive council of the Encyclopedia of Life (2010).

Personal life 
Ismail Serageldin was married to the late Mrs. Nevine Madkour with one son. He is tri-lingual: Arabic, French and English.

Honorary degrees 

 1996: Doctor of Sociology, University of Bucharest, Romania
 1996: Doctor of Agricultural Science, University of Melbourne, Australia
 1997: Doctor of Science, Indian Agricultural Research Institute, India
 1998: Doctor of International Affairs, American University, Washington, D.C., United States
 1998: Doctor of Science, Punjab Agricultural University, India 
 1998: Doctor of Science, Tamil Nadu Veterinary and Animal Sciences University, India
 1998: Doctor of Natural resource management, Ohio State University, United States
 1999: Doctor of Science, Tamil Nadu Agricultural University, Coimbatore, India
 1999: Doctor of Science, Acharya N. G. Ranga Agricultural University, Hyderabad, India
 1999: Doctor of Economics and Management, CNAM, Paris, France
 1999: Doctor of Science, Egerton University, Kenya
 1999: Doctor of Agricultural Science, University of Tuscia, Italy
 2000: Doctor of Humane Letters, American University in Cairo, Egypt
 2002: Doctor of Science, Southern New Hampshire University, Manchester, New Hampshire, United States
 2003: Doctor of Science, McGill University, Montreal, Quebec, Canada
 2004: Doctor of Letters, University of Technology, Sydney, Australia
 2004: Doctor of Letters, Paul Sabatier University, Toulouse, France
 2005: Doctor of Laws, University of Minnesota, Minneapolis, United States
 2006: Doctor of Letters, Université de Nantes, Nantes, France
 2007: Doctor of Science, Azerbaijan State Economic University, Baku, Azerbaijan
 2007: Doctor of Society Development, Khazar University, Baku, Azerbaijan 
 2008: Doctor of Letters, Laval University, Quebec City, Canada 
 2009: Doctor of Arts, Beirut Arab University, Beirut, Lebanon 
 2009: Doctor Diploma, Azerbaijan Cooperation University, Baku, Azerbaijan
 2009: Doctor Diploma, National Academy of Sciences, Institute of History, Baku Azerbaijan
 2009: Doctor of Letters, University of Dublin, Dublin, Ireland
 2010: Doctor Degree, ANAS Institute of Oriental Studies, Baku, Azerbaijan
 2010: Doctor Degree, Georgian American University, Tbilisi, Georgia 
 2010: Doctor Degree, Free University of Tbilisi, Georgia 
 2012: Doctor Degree, University of Georgia, Tbilisi, Georgia 
 2012: Doctor Degree, Ilia State University, Tbilisi, Georgia
 2012: Doctor Degree, State Agricultural University, Ganja, Azerbaijan 
 2012: Doctor Degree, Odlar Yurdu State University, Baku, Azerbaijan
 2015: Doctor of Humane Letters, American University of Beirut, Lebanon
 2016: Doctor Honoris Causa of Sofia University St. Kliment Ohridski, Bulgaria.
 2016: Doctor degree of Ganja State University, Azerbaijan.
 2017: Doctor degree, Marin Barleti University, Tirana, Albania
 2017: Doctor Degree, University of Latvia, Riga, Latvia

Previous appointments 
 Founding Director of the new Library of Alexandria (Bibliotheca Alexandrina) - (2002-2017)
 Professor of the International Chair “Savoirs contre Pauvreté” (Knowledge Against Poverty), Collège de France, (2010-2011).
 Distinguished University Professor at Wageningen University, the Netherlands.
 Co-chair of the African Biotechnology Panel (with Calestous Juma).
 Member of the High Level Group (HLG) of the Secretary-General's UN initiative for the Alliance of Civilizations, (2005-2006).
 Chairman of the Youth Employment Summit (YES) Campaign, (1998-2002).
 Ambassador of the Alliance of Civilizations. 
 Special Advisor to the World Bank.
 Co-chair (with Jacob Palis) of the Inter-Academy Council Panel on Capacity Building in Science and Technology, (2002-2004).
 Distinguished Visiting Professor at the American University in Cairo (AUC), (2000/2001).
 Advisor to the Egyptian Government on the Bibliotheca Alexandrina.
 Vice President of the World Bank till July 2000, (for Environmentally and Socially Sustainable Development, from October 1992 to March 1998, and for Special Programs from March 1998 to July 2000)
 Chairman of Consultative Group on International Agricultural Research (CGIAR, 1994–2000).
 Chairman of Consultative Group to Assist the Poorest (CGAP), a microfinance program, (1995-2000).
 Chairman of the Global Water Partnership, (GWP, 1996–2000).
 Chairman, World Commission for Water in the 21st Century, (August 1998-March 2000).
 Vice President of the Academy of Sciences for the Developing World (TWAS).

He also worked in a number of capacities at:
 The World Bank since joining in 1972.
 Economist in Education and Human Resources (1972-1976)
 Division Chief for Technical Assistance and Special Studies (1977-1980)
 Urban Projects in Europe, the Middle East and North Africa (1980-1983)
 Director of Programs in West Africa (1984-1987)
 Country Director of Central and Occidental Africa (1987-1989)
 Technical Director of all Sub-Saharan Africa (1990-1992)
 Vice-president of Environmentally and Socially Sustainable Development (1993-1998).

Professional memberships 
 Vice President and member of Institut d'Egypte (Egyptian Academy of Science).
 Member of US National Academy of Sciences (Public Welfare Medalist).
 Member of the American Philosophical Society, Philadelphia.
 Member of the American Academy of Arts and Sciences.
 Member of Academy of Sciences of the Developing World (TWAS) Trieste, Italy.
 African Academy of Sciences.
 Bangladesh Academy of Science, Dhaka.
 National Academy of Agricultural Sciences, India.
 European Academy of Sciences and Arts, Austria.
 American Institute of Certified Planners (AICP).
 World Academy of Arts and Sciences, USA.
 Academia Bibliotheca Alexandrina (ABA).
 Science and Technology in Society (STS) Forum.
 The Royal Society of Arts and Sciences in Gothenburg.
 Supreme Council for Culture, Egypt.
 The International Academy of Food Science & Technology, Canada.
 Scientific Advisory Committee of the World Social Science Report 2013, UNESCO.
 Co-chair of the BoT of Nizami Ganjavi International Center.
 Honorary Academician of the Royal European Academy of Doctors, Barcelona, Spain.

Awards 
 1999: First recipient of Grameen Foundation (USA) Award, for a lifetime commitment to combating poverty.
 2003: Officer of the Order of Arts and Letters, awarded by the Government of France.
 2004: Pablo Neruda Medal of Honor, awarded by the Government of Chile.
 2006: The Jamnalal Bajaj Award, for promoting Gandhian values outside India.
 2008: Order of the Rising Sun – Gold and Silver Star, awarded by the Emperor of Japan.
 2008: Champion of Youth Award, by the World Youth Congress in Quebec.
 2008: Knight of the French Legion of Honor, awarded by the President of France.
 2010: The Dr. M. S. Swaminathan Award for Environmental Protection, (Chennai, India).
 2010: Millennium Excellence Award for Lifetime Africa Achievement Prize, awarded by the Excellence Awards Foundation,   Ghana.
 2011: The Public Welfare Medal, by the National Academy of Sciences, Washington DC.
 2011: Commander of the Order of Arts & Letters, awarded by the Government of France.
 2013: Calouste Gulbenkian Prize, awarded by the Calouste Gulbenkian Foundation, Portugal.
 2015:  Nizami Ganjavi Gold Medal of the Republic of Azerbaijan awarded by Azerbaijan National Academy of Sciences
 2015: The “Dostlug” Order (Order of Friendship)  of Azerbaijan awarded by President of Azerbaijan
 2016: Marianna V. Vardinoyannis Foundation Award 2016
 2016: Honorary Sign of the President of the Bulgarian  Academy of Sciences
 2017: The Order of George Kastrioti Skanderbeg issued by the President of the Republic of Albania.

Publications and speeches 

Over 100 books and monographs (edited or authored), in addition to 500 articles, book chapters, and technical papers on various topics, some of which are:
 Water Supply, Sanitation, and Environmental Sustainability: The Financing Challenge, 1994.
 Nurturing Development, 1995. 
 Sustainability and the Wealth of Nations, 1996. 
 Milestones of Renewal: A Journey of Hope and Accomplishment, 1996. 
 Architecture of Empowerment, 1997. 
 Rural Well-Being: From Vision to Action, 1997, (with David Steeds). 
 The Modernity of Shakespeare, 1998. 
 Themes for the Third Millennium, the Challenge for Rural Sociology in an Urbanizing World, 1999. 
 Biotechnology and Biosafety, 1999, (with Wanda Collins). 
 Very Special Places, 1999. 
 Promethean Science, 2000, (with G. Persley). 
 Biotechnology and Sustainable Development: Voices of the South and North, 2003, (with G. Persley). 
 Discovery to Delivery, 2005, (with G. Persley). 
 Changing Lives, 2006, (with E. Masood). 
 Born Digital, 2006. 
 Reflections on Our Digital Future, 2006. 
 Inventing Our Future: Essays on Freedom; Democracy and Reform in the Arab World, 2007. (2nd edition) 
 Science: The Culture of Living Change, 2007. (2nd edition) 
 Freedom of Expression, 2007. 
 Islam and Democracy, 2008. 
 The Shape of Tomorrow, 2010. 
 The Arab Cultural Project, 2010. 
 Mobiliser le savoir pour éradiquer la faim, (the college de France/Fayard, Paris 2011). 
 The Making of Social Justice, (the 2011 Mandela Lecture, Johannesburg, South Africa). 
 The Culture Of The Book: The Book Yesterday, Today and Tomorrow, 2012. DVD
 Reflections on Education: On Education and the Future of the Arab World: Tomorrow's Universities and the Seven Pillars of Knowledge Revolution, 2013.
 The Poetry of the Magnificent Sage, 2013. 
 Shakespeare and the Burden of Leadership, 2013. DVD 
 The Poetry of the Magnificent Sage, 2013. DVD 
 Shakespeare's Henry V: Modern Reflections on a Medieval Hero, 2013. DVD 
 Shakespeare's Richard II: Reflections of the Undoing of a King, 2013. DVD 
 Public Health and Private Medicine: Looking Back and Looking Forward, 2013. DVD 
 La Renaissance de la Bibliotheca Alexandrina, 2014. DVD 
 Jurji Zaidan: The Man and his Legacy, 2014. DVD 
 Hassan Fathy: Egypt's Visionary Architect, 2015. DVD 
 Experiencing Alexandria: The City as Text and Context, 2015. DVD 
 Global Ethics: Wise Words from the Sage of Ganja, 2015. DVD 
 The Challenge: A Cultural Program to Reject Extremism and Violence, 2015.

Television programs prepared, produced and presented by Serageldin 
 Cairo Salon: A weekly program on Egypt's Channel One - 128 episodes. 
 Muslim Scientists: A daily five-minute series aired throughout the month of Ramadan on Egypt's Channel One. 
 Horizons: 15 science programs of 30 minutes each, presented in two versions in English and Arabic. 
 Dialogues on Science: 6 episodes of 45 minutes each, in Arabic.

References

External links 

 Dr. Serageldin's Official page
 Bibliotheca Alexandrina Official page

1944 births
Living people
People from Giza
Academic staff of Cairo University
Members of the Shura Council
Cairo University alumni
Harvard University alumni
Academic staff of Wageningen University and Research
Fellows of Bangladesh Academy of Sciences
Fellows of the American Academy of Arts and Sciences
Members of the European Academy of Sciences and Arts
Fellows of the African Academy of Sciences